Abortion is legally accepted in Hungary starting in 1953, with the most recent change to abortion laws being Act LXXIX of 1992 on the protection of fetal life. Under the current laws, abortions may be performed up to 12 weeks but may be extended up to 24 weeks in certain circumstances.

Access to abortion requires the woman to obtain a certificate from a gynecologist confirming the pregnancy then seek counseling from a midwife at the Family Protection Service at least twice and wait 72 hours before the procedure may be performed.

History of legalisation

Abortion in socialist Hungary 
Abortion was subject to legal liberalization as early as 1953. The abortion law was changed three times since then, in 1956, 1973, and 1992. As a result of that, Hungary has long had a liberal abortion law, although certain obstacles for accessing abortion have always existed. After the fall of communism in Hungary, the country experienced serious social and economic distress; nevertheless, the newly emerging conservative Catholic forces have failed to convince the government to prohibit abortion: the new post-communist 1992 law largely mirrored the old one, in some ways being even more liberal than the former one.

Current law
Abortion is regulated under the Act LXXIX of 1992 on the protection of fetal life. Under this law, an abortion is normally allowed until 12 weeks. However, in certain circumstances the limit can be extended to 18, 20 or 24 weeks. A pregnancy may be terminated at any time if the fetus is lethally affected (i.e. anencephaly). The pregnancy can be extended to 18 weeks if the woman's health is in severe danger or is a result of a rape and that added to those conditions, the woman was not aware of her pregnancy before because of a medical condition or of an institution's mistake. To extend it to 24 weeks, the fetus must have a 50% risk of presenting a genetic or teratological malformation (see Birth defect).

In 1998, the country's highest court demanded that a definition be supplied for the term "grave crisis situation", as there were concerns that women undergoing the procedure may not actually be in "crisis", and if they were, that they get psychiatric help after their abortion. On June 29, 2000, the Ministry of Health defined a "grave crisis situation" as "when it causes bodily or mental impairment, or a socially intolerable situation".

The Hungarian Government organized an anti-abortion campaign in 2011 where posters were shown with an image of a baby in the womb, with the caption saying, "I understand that you are not yet ready for me, but give me up to the adoption agency, LET ME LIVE!" The Government has been sharply criticised for using European Union funds on the campaign. An EU Commissioner Viviane Reding said that the campaign "goes against European values."

The new constitution of Hungary, enacted in 2012, states that human life will be protected from the moment of conception, although, so far, the abortion law has not been changed.

Since 2017, because of demographic challenges, Orban's government has put in place a new Family policy in Hungary with the Family Protection Action Plan, providing for example, a flat tax and family allowances in order to increase natality rates in Hungary. With this pro-natalist policy, hospitals have the rights to refuse to provide abortions, clinics that are providing them without trying to discourage women have to face political pressure and the government is putting in place anti-abortion campaigns in the metro and in the schools. Those campaigns are a violation of the European Union's rules regarding the financing programme that Hungary is receiving.

In 2022 15 September, Hungary passed new abortion restrictions, with a Mandatory ultrasounds bill. Where women who are seeking an abortion will now be obliged to “listen to the foetal heartbeat” before they can have an abortion. This Bill was pushed for by the far-right Mi Hazank (Our Homeland) party.

The procedure
Hungary is influenced by Roman Catholicism, and, although abortion is legal, it is not easy to access: women must go through a specific procedure involving counseling, a waiting period, and a certificate from a midwife in order to obtain an abortion.

To terminate a pregnancy, the woman and, if possible, the father are required to meet with the Family Protection Service at least twice to receive information about the termination of the pregnancy. The woman has to bring a letter from her gynecologist to confirm the pregnancy and the specially trained midwife of the Family Protection Service will provide her information to choose another solution. If the woman still wants the abortion, she has to come back within 72 hours. The staff member will provide her information about the termination process and issue a hospital referral that the woman and, if possible, the father, must sign. On the day of the abortion, the woman can go to the health institution of her choice and must again sign documents confirming the termination of her pregnancy. According to the Committee on the Elimination of Discrimination against Women, conscientious objection among Hungarian doctors is an obstacle to abortion.

Statistics

Between 2010 and 2015 the number of reported abortions per year dropped by 22.9 per cent, which was attributed to the introduction of pro-family measures by the Hungarian Government.
Adoption is promoted by the state where women do not want to keep their baby. There are also educational classes and aid to families. In July 2022, it was reported that a number of medical practitioners willing to perform abortions had been decreasing.

See also
 Women in Hungary

References



Hungary
Healthcare in Hungary
Law of Hungary
Hungary